The  (PJ) is the national criminal investigation police agency of Portugal, focused in fighting serious crimes, including homicides, kidnapping, organized crime, terrorism, illegal drug trade, corruption, cybercrime and financial crime. It is integrated into the Ministry of Justice, but operates under the supervision of the Public Ministry.

Several countries and territories that were once overseas provinces of Portugal maintain criminal investigation police forces modeled after the Portuguese one, with some of them retaining also the name Polícia Judiciária. These are the cases of Cabo Verde, Guinea-Bissau and Macau.

The Polícia Judiciária Militar (Military Judiciary Police) is a separate criminal investigation police agency that operates under the Ministry of National Defense. This agency is responsible for the investigation of military crimes and crimes committed among the Portuguese Armed Forces.

History
In 1945, after a general police restructuring in Portugal took place, the Polícia Judiciária (Judiciary Police) such as it exists today was created by Decree-Law No. 35042 of 20 October 1945 under the direction of Judge Monteiro Júnior, and was organically integrated into the Ministry of Justice, replacing the Criminal Investigation Police (PIC).

Integrated into the general scheme of the ordinary procedural system and of the crime prevention and repression institutions, the Polícia Judiciária was defined as the entity in charge of "investigating criminal offences and finding their perpetrators, conducting preparatory investigations for the corresponding proceedings and organising crime prevention, mainly with regard to habitual crime".

In 1958, the Polícia Judiciária inaugurated its new premises at Rua Gomes Freire, in Lisbon, which were built resorting to prison labour. The building became the institution's headquarters, a situation which persists to this day.

The Forensic Science Laboratory, under the direction of Professor Alberto Ralha, and the Criminal Sciences Practical School, both organically integrated into the Polícia Judiciária, were founded in 1957.

The first major restructuring of the Polícia Judiciária occurred in 1977 under the direction of Judge Lourenço Martins. Decree-Law No. 364/77 of 2 September 1977 defined this police service as "a crime prevention and investigation service, assisting the administration of justice, hierarchically organised under the Minister of Justice".

The Judiciary Police School was established in 1978, based on the existing Criminal Sciences Practical School, in order to "ensure the training and retraining of the Polícia Judiciária staff", as well as to plan and implement actions for the selection, training and improvement of the Polícia Judiciária's officers.

Initially based in Lisbon, Oporto and Coimbra, a few years after its creation the Polícia Judiciária embarked on a process of territorial expansion, setting up new departments in various parts of the country, especially in areas with high crime rates.

In 1990, within the General Directorate of the Polícia Judiciária and besides the already existing Central Office for Combating Banditry, Decree-Law No. 295-A/90 of 21 September 1990 created the Central Office for Drug Trafficking Investigation, the Central Office for Investigating Corruption, Fraud and Economic and Financial Crime, as well as the Central Department for Information Registration and Crime Prevention from the then extinct Central Office for Prevention and Investigation and Central Records and Information Archive.

The Europol National Unit was created in 1996, organically integrated in the Polícia Judiciária and temporarily located in Leiria, from a structure that was already there ensuring connections with the then called Europol Drugs Unit, future "Europol".

Following a protocol signed by those responsible, the Polícia Judiciária, together with the other police and security forces and services, started a process of operational cooperation to combat drug trafficking based on information sharing, cooperation between forces, operational coordination and joint intervention.

In 2000, the national police structure was reformed following the approval of the Organisation of Criminal Investigation Act (LOIC). As a result, the Polícia Judiciária was restructured for the second time pursuant to Decree-Law No. 275-A/2000 of 9 November 2000. Both instruments were amended in 2008 with the publication of LOIC No. 49/2008 of 27 August 2008 and of the Polícia Judiciária’s new organic law, Law No. 37/2008 of 6 August 2008.

More than 19 years after the entry into force of Decree-Law No. 275-A/2000 of 9 November 2000, approving the organisational structure of the PJ and the statutory rules governing the special corps of this police, and more than 10 years since Law No. 37/2008 of 6 August 2008, aiming to adapt the structure to emerging organisational and operational requirements and which has since been complemented by Decree-Law No. 42/2009 of 12 February 2009, defining the powers of the core units of the PJ, reality shows a change that needs to be addressed.

In fact, the last decades have seen profound social and economic changes that go beyond the territorial barriers of the State, with unequivocal repercussions as to the way in which criminal acts are committed. The danger posed today by the phenomenon of terrorism and the constant change in transnational organised crime, which is becoming increasingly sophisticated, therefore evokes realities that call for an appropriate and effective response by the State.

In the current criminological context of imminent danger to essential legal assets worthy of criminal protection, and in view of the unpredictability of the actions of criminal and terrorist organisations, it is essential that the State secures the purpose of strengthening the PJ as to its primarily recognised role in the prevention and investigation of the most serious forms of crime, as is the case with transnational organised crime and cybercrime, due to the sophistication in criminal action with resort to new and complex technologies that are not limited to the geographical area of the national territory.

The legal framework governing the structure of the PJ, scattered over a number of pieces of legislation, justifies the organisational redefinition of the PJ, providing it internally with more interactive and efficient operational units, in order to enhance the contribution of this police in the scope of its primary intervention in the judicial and prosecuting system, to which the PJ is intimately linked, as well as within the internal security system in which it is integrated. Thus, the mission and tasks of the PJ are deepened, in view of the current legal and institutional framework in terms of criminal investigation and internal security, with the resulting anticipated organisation of powers conferred by the aforementioned systems.

The challenges faced by the Portuguese society today are based on the strong conviction that a specially prepared, technically and scientifically robust criminal police is essential, backed by an organisational structure founded on the idea of a greater interconnection between the various units, making it clear that the operational core structure is based on units integrating the criminal investigation area. It is also important to note that the performance of those noticeably operational units is complemented by units that, sharing the same nature, perform the essential task of providing technical support to crime prevention and investigation, thus establishing a greater operational interconnection.

The scientific autonomy of those units performing specialised support tasks, of technical and scientific nature, to criminal investigation is also strengthened. This autonomy results not only from their formal confirmation, but, above all, from the definition of their powers, taking into account the highly technical and scientific nature of the tasks they are legally entrusted with for carrying out expertise and examinations, as is the case with the Forensic Science Laboratory, the Financial and Accounting Expertise Unit and the now established Technological and Computer Expertise Unit.

At the same time, the role of other organisational units has been redefined, integrating them in the management and organisational development area and in the management control, performance evaluation, and inspection and disciplinary control area, granting these areas powers that reveal a suitability to modern organisational paradigms of the State and an improvement of management and evaluation instruments, as a fundamental step towards providing the PJ with mechanisms placing it on the level of a modern criminal investigation police capable of responding effectively, also from an organisational point of view, to the arising challenges. The Services Directorate for Innovation and Development and the Services Directorate for Planning, Quality and Evaluation are examples thereof, together with the traditional management units for both property and human resources.

While continuing to recognise the important role of the Institute for Judiciary Police and Criminal Sciences, maintaining it as a central unit in the dependency of the national director, its performance in terms of specific training of the PJ staff and the consolidation of technical and scientific knowledge in criminal investigation and other related areas, together with the driving force that it can establish in the deepening of knowledge, as regards the exchange with other similar or academic entities, as well as in the promotion and disclosure of multidisciplinary scientific research, must be stressed.

As it evolves and keeps pace with the complexity and sophistication of society, the Polícia Judiciária defines itself as a higher criminal police force, hierarchically positioned under the Minister of Justice and supervised in accordance with the law.

Its mission is to assist the judicial and prosecuting authorities in investigations, as well as to develop and promote actions for crime prevention, detection and investigation within its sphere of competence or entrusted to it by the relevant judicial and prosecuting authorities.

Organization
The Polícia Judiciária is headed by a National Director, appointed together by the Prime-Minister and the Minister of Justice.

Mission
Under the terms of the decree-law regulating its new organisational structure and the Organisation of Criminal Investigation Act (LOIC) (Act no. 49/2008, 27 August), it is the mission of the Polícia Judiciária to assist the judicial and prosecuting authorities in criminal investigations specifically entrusted to it under LOIC or delegated to it by the competent judicial or prosecuting authorities.

The PJ pursues the following objectives:

 To develop and promote prevention, detection and criminal investigation actions within its competence or entrusted to it by the Internal Security Act, the Criminal Policy Framework Law and national strategies defining criminal policy goals, priorities and guidelines;

To carry out, as an official entity, expertise and examinations.

Equipment
Although the Polícia Judiciária can use virtually any weapons of any caliber if necessary, they are issued with the Glock 19 as their standard firearm - like their Polícia de Segurança Pública and Guarda Nacional Republicana counterparts - with the Glock 26 used by mainly female agents.

 Glock 19
 Glock 26
 Uzi
 Benelli M3
 Mossberg 500
IWI Tavor
 Ballistic shield
 Bulletproof vest

References

External links
Polícia Judiciária

Specialist law enforcement agencies of Portugal